Joseph Charles Osmanski (December 26, 1917 – July 24, 1993) was an American football fullback in the National Football League (NFL) for the Chicago Bears and New York Bulldogs. He played college football at the College of the Holy Cross and was drafted in the 18th round of the 1941 NFL Draft by the Washington Redskins.

Osmanski was the younger brother of Bears player Bill Osmanski. The two became teammates in Chicago in 1946 when Bill returned from World War II and Joe was traded to the team.

References

External links
 

1917 births
1993 deaths
American football fullbacks
Chicago Bears players
Holy Cross Crusaders football players
New York Bulldogs players
DePaul University alumni
Players of American football from Providence, Rhode Island
American people of Polish descent